Sachika Udara (born 10 September 1995) is a Sri Lankan cricketer. He made his first-class debut for Sri Lanka Air Force Sports Club in Tier B of the 2018–19 Premier League Tournament on 1 February 2019.

References

External links
 

1995 births
Living people
Sri Lankan cricketers
Sri Lanka Air Force Sports Club cricketers
Place of birth missing (living people)